The Arnhem striped ctenotus (Ctenotus astictus)  is a species of skink found in Northern Territory in Australia.

References

astictus
Reptiles described in 1995
Taxa named by Paul Horner (herpetologist)